General elections were held in Cambodia on 10 June 1962. Only candidates of the Sangkum party were allowed to contest the election, although more than one candidate could run in a constituency. As a result, the party won all 77 seats.

Results

References

Cambodia
Elections in Cambodia
1962 in Cambodia
One-party elections
Election and referendum articles with incomplete results